Chiltern Railways, formally The Chiltern Railway Company Limited, is a British train operating company that has operated the Chiltern Railways franchise since July 1996. Since 2009, it has been a subsidiary of Arriva UK Trains.

Chiltern Railways was founded as M40 Trains by a group of ex-British Rail managers backed by John Laing and 3i; in June 1996, it was announced that M40 Trains had been awarded the Chiltern Railways franchise. On 21 July 1996, it took over operations from British Rail. The company promptly commenced the redoubling of the Chiltern Main Line under the Evergreen initiative and ordered the Class 168 Clubman diesel multiple units (DMUs) to supplement its ex-British Rail fleet. Following the awarding of a 20-year franchise to Chiltern Railways in August 2000, Evergreen phase 2 works begun to raise line speeds around Beaconsfield, built two new platforms at its London Marylebone terminus. In January 2010, a £250 million upgrade package was agreed for Evergreen phase 3, remodelling the line and permitting 100 mph operations, thus greatly reducing journey times.

In August 2002, the John Laing Group became the sole owner of Chiltern Railways after buying out all other shareholders; shortly after John Laing's purchase by Henderson Equity Partners, the company was sold to the German publicly owned railway company Deutsche Bahn in January 2008. Chiltern Railways became a subsidiary of Arriva UK Trains as a result of restructuring during early 2011. Around this time, Chiltern was considered one of the best railway operators in Britain, with Public Performance Measure (PPM) regularly over 90%. However, the introduction of new timetables during the 2010s was repeatedly received negatively by the travelling public. Severe disruption to Chiltern's services occurred following the collapse of Gerrards Cross Tunnel on 30 June 2005; an unplanned six week closure of the main line was forced, resulting in compensation being paid by Tesco to both Chiltern Railways and Network Rail.

Chiltern Railways operates commuter/regional rail passenger services from its central London terminus at Marylebone along the M40 corridor to destinations in Buckinghamshire, Oxfordshire and Warwickshire, as well as long-distance services to the West Midlands along two routes. From December 2010, Chiltern began operating the Chiltern Mainline service of two peak-hour locomotive-hauled services consisting of a Class 67 hauling a rake of modernised Mark 3 coaches and a Driving Van Trailer.

History
Chiltern Railways originated with a number of former British Rail managers who sought to conduct a management buyout on one of the soon-to-be-created rail franchises that would be produced as a part of the privatisation of British Rail. In April 1995, they were granted a licence by the railway regulator. However, the team recognised that they lacked the resources to successfully pursue a bid, thus they secured the backing of the infrastructure investment group John Laing and the venture capital specialist 3i.

In October 1995, M40 Trains Limited which was established; the various railway managers held a combined 51% shareholding in the business, while the John Laing Group and 3i held 26% and 23% stakes respectively. The company reportedly spent £38 million in its bid for the Chiltern Railways franchise. In June 1996, the Director of Passenger Rail Franchising awarded the franchise to M40 Trains for an initial period of seven years. It was the only franchise operator to have as many as 51% of its shared controlled by its directors.

On 21 July 1996, the company commenced operations, taking over from the publicly owned British Rail. Chiltern Railways was the first railway franchise to order new rolling stock in the post-privatisation era in the form of the Class 168 Clubman diesel multiple units (DMUs). However, their introduction was marred by unreliability, in part due to their rushed entry into service in response to booming passenger demand. By April 1999, the company claimed to employ 50% more staff than it had at the start of the franchise, and to be running 25% more services than had been operated by British Rail. Meanwhile, under the terms of the franchise agreement, the annual subsidy provided by the British government was gradually reduced.

During early 1999, the ownership of M40 Trains underwent substantial changes; the John Laing Group opted to increase its shareholding in the venture to 84% via the purchase of shares from their previous holders; the outstanding 16% of shares were owned by several members of the former British Rail management team.

In March 2000 the Shadow Strategic Rail Authority announced that both M40 Trains and the British transport group Go-Ahead had been shortlisted to bid for the next Chiltern franchise. In August 2000, M40 Trains was awarded the new franchise, which was set to run for 20 years, conditional on various investments being made across that period. On 3 March 2002, the new franchise period began.

In August 2002, John Laing acquired the remaining 16% of shares in M40 Trains that it did not already own. In September 2006, John Laing was purchased by the global investment firm Henderson Equity Partners in exchange for £887 million.

In June 2006, M40 Trains was invited by the Department for Transport to lodge a bid to operate the Snow Hill Lines, then operated by Central Trains, as part of the letting of the West Midlands franchise. However, this bid was not successful.

During mid-2005, Chiltern Railways' services were heavily disrupted by the collapse of Gerrards Cross Tunnel. In 1996, the British retailer Tesco sought to build a supermarket near Gerrards Cross railway station; despite the local council's initial objection to the scheme, it was approved by the Deputy Prime Minister John Prescott in July 1998. Due to a lack of available space, Tesco started building a tunnel over the active railway line to provide suitable land for the development. On 30 June 2005, the partially-constructed tunnel collapsed; nobody was injured, but a complete closure of the line was enacted for over six weeks before being permitted to reopen on 20 August 2005. Tesco paid an estimated £200million of compensation to both Chiltern Railways and Network Rail for the disruption; the retailer also pledged to fund a media campaign to win back passengers lost by the route's unplanned closure. The tunnel's construction resumed in January 2009. In late November 2010, the completed store was opened.

In July 2007, Henderson Equity Partners announced that its intention to sell on Laing Rail along with the Chiltern Railways franchise. Amongst the parties to express interest in acquiring the company were the transport groups Arriva and Go-Ahead. However, by December 2007, only the German publicly owned railway company Deutsche Bahn and the Dutch transport company NedRail reportedly remained in the bidding contest. In January 2008, Laing Rail was purchased by Deutsche Bahn; accordingly Chiltern Railways became a part of the DB Regio group. During early 2011, the company was restructured, with DB Regio becoming a subsidiary of Arriva UK Trains.

During May 2011, Chiltern took over operating services on the Oxford–Bicester line from First Great Western. On 26 October 2015, the company opened two new stations, Oxford Parkway and Bicester Village, providing services between north Oxford and London Marylebone. In December 2016, Chiltern Railways started running train services from Oxford to London Marylebone.

In 2021, following the COVID-19 emergency measures, Chiltern was awarded a new direct contract by the Department for Transport, replacing its franchise agreement, expiring on 12 December 2027.

Chiltern Railways is one of several train operators impacted by the 2022–2023 United Kingdom railway strikes, the first national rail strike in the UK for three decades. Its workers were amongst those are participating in industrial action due to a dispute over pay and working conditions.

Services

Chiltern Railways operates regular services on five routes.

The Chiltern Main Line is the core route for the majority of Chiltern Railways services and is one of two "mainline routes" operated by the company. The route links the major cities of London and Birmingham (Marylebone and Snow Hill stations respectively), passing through the towns of High Wycombe, Banbury, Royal Leamington Spa, Warwick and Solihull. Chiltern Railways operates trains along the entire line, services ranging from stopping suburban trains (e.g. London Marylebone – Gerrards Cross) to express trains running the full length of the line between London and Birmingham. The fastest timetabled journey from Birmingham to London by this route is 99minutes (compared with 82minutes using Avanti West Coast services between Birmingham New Street and London Euston via the West Coast Main Line). In addition to the Chiltern Railways services, CrossCountry also operates regular services on the line north of Banbury, and West Midlands Trains operates regular services north of Dorridge.

The London–Aylesbury line is the second "mainline route" operated by the company. The route links London (Marylebone) with Aylesbury via Amersham. All Chiltern Railways services on this route run the full length of the line between Marylebone and Aylesbury stations and call at all stations north of Amersham; most trains are extended one station further to Aylesbury Vale Parkway. Beyond Harrow-on-the-Hill, the tracks are shared between Chiltern Railways and Metropolitan line services. This is an example of National Rail services using non-Network Rail tracks, and it uses a unique unregulated track-access agreement with London Underground. Beyond Amersham (where the Metropolitan line terminates), all services are operated by Chiltern Railways only.

The other three routes regularly served by the company are all branch lines. The Aylesbury–Princes Risborough line links Princes Risborough, on the Chiltern Main Line, with Aylesbury, on the London to Aylesbury Line. Most trains on the line continue beyond Princes Risborough to London Marylebone, which gives Aylesbury an alternative route to reach central London; however, a few services terminate at Princes Risborough. The Oxford–Bicester line branches off the Chiltern Main Line just south of Bicester and links the town with Oxford. The line is mostly served by express services to and from Marylebone. Until December 2016, the line terminated a few miles northeast of Oxford, at the nearby Oxford Parkway station; the line was then extended to the main Oxford station. The Leamington–Stratford line branches off the Chiltern Main Line at Hatton (a few miles west of Leamington Spa) and runs to Stratford-upon-Avon. The branch line is also operated by regular West Midlands Trains services.

As of December 2022, its routes off-peak Monday to Friday include:

Extension to Kidderminster
These trains run to Marylebone in the morning peak and return towards Kidderminster in the evening peak. The trains also call at some stations between Birmingham Moor Street and Kidderminster, although not all services have the same calling pattern.

, there are four trains per day in each direction between Marylebone and Kidderminster, plus another one which is extended only as far as Stourbridge Junction. On Saturdays, there are also four morning trains from Kidderminster to Marylebone from the December 2017 return services in the evening were introduced. There were no Chiltern Railways service to Kidderminster on Sundays until the December 2017 timetable when two trains in each direction were introduced.

Regular trains between Birmingham Moor Street, Stourbridge Junction and Kidderminster are operated by West Midlands Trains as part of its Snow Hill route service.

Parliamentary trains

Chiltern Railways operates two parliamentary train services:
There is no corresponding return service heading towards Oxford. This service exists to maintain route knowledge for Chiltern Railways' drivers. Regular services on the line are operated by Great Western Railway and CrossCountry.
They were then diverted to West Ealing following closure of the easternmost section of the New North Main line for High Speed 2 construction. The parliamentary service used to run a return service, with the returning service terminating at High Wycombe. At the start of the COVID-19 pandemic, the service was suspended until December 2021. , the service no longer runs and has been replaced by a bus service.

Buckinghamshire Railway Centre
However, this did not happen in 2019 and their future is uncertain. The link will continue to be used by freight services to Calvert.

Tickets
Since winning the franchise, Chiltern has introduced "Route: High Wycombe" tickets for the Chiltern route between Birmingham and London that are considerably cheaper than "Route: Any Permitted" tickets, valid on the faster Avanti West Coast service to London Euston as well a number of other operators and routes. Chiltern offers only standard class, not standard and First Class as on Avanti services. However, Chiltern does offer a premium economy "Business Zone" carriage on a small number of peak-time trains between Birmingham or Oxford and London.  Passengers pay an upgrade fee to sit in a larger first-class-style seat; and formerly, this upgrade came with complimentary refreshments but, since May 2017, refreshment services have been cut on all Chiltern Railways services, meaning the "Business Zone" no longer comes with complimentary refreshments.

Performance

Chiltern Railways' early operations were subject to considerable criticism. During 1998, its poor performance figures in criteria such as reliability, punctuality, and customer approval has led to financial penalties being incurred by the company, some of which was in the form of refunds to its passengers.

By the mid-2010s, Chiltern was considered one of the best railway operators in Britain, with Public Performance Measure (PPM) regularly over 90%, until the introduction of changes in November 2015, and infrastructure issues saw punctuality fall to 86% in December 2015. Chiltern's PPM is measured on stricter conditions than its long-distance rivals, such as Avanti West Coast, as Chiltern has a five-minute window for performance while others have a ten-minute window.

Performance figures published by Network Rail rate Chiltern Railways sixth in train operating companies in the UK at 89.4% (PPM – period 9) and 94.3% (MAA) for the year to 12 December 2015.

A new timetable introduced in September 2011, combined with significant disruption caused by engineering work, caused a negative reaction from customers. A petition to have the service reviewed was started, and articles describing the disrupted journeys of commuters appeared in the local press.

A new timetable introduced in December 2012 also met with frustration and opposition from some customers, particularly those using Saunderton and Princes Risborough stations.

Project Evergreen
Evergreen is the name given by Chiltern to the major infrastructure works that the company has committed to over the 20-year duration of its franchise to improve routes and services. This has been divided into three distinct phases.

Evergreen 1
Finally, the line speed limit was raised following appropriate infrastructure improvements.

Evergreen 2
Phase 2 commenced shortly following the award of Chiltern's 20-year franchise period in August 2000. Further improvements in this phase included the enactment of signalling improvements between High Wycombe and Bicester, as well as between Princes Risborough and Aylesbury, two new platforms were constructed at London Marylebone on land formerly occupied by the carriage sidings, while a new depot was constructed at Wembley.

Evergreen 3
The Department for Transport, Chiltern Railways and Network Rail agreed in January 2010 to a £250million upgrade of the Chiltern Main Line.

Phase 1
Phase 1 of the project, now complete, involved upgrading the Marylebone – Birmingham Chiltern Main Line to permit  running on an additional  of route. Junctions at Neasden, Northolt and Aynho were remodelled to permit higher speeds. The existing 'down' track continues to serve  station. The former speed restrictions through  have been removed to permit 100mph running. Two additional terminating platforms at Birmingham Moor Street were reopened in December 2010. Accelerated services were initially planned to start in May 2011, but there were delays and it was not until 5 September 2011 that Chiltern was able to introduce a new timetable to take advantage of the improvements.

As a result of the speed increases, journey times have been reduced significantly. From Marylebone, the fastest peak-hour journey time to Birmingham Moor Street is now 90minutes, instead of 117minutes previously. Chiltern Railways former chairman Adrian Shooter stated: "This is the biggest passenger rail project for several generations not to call on the taxpayer for support. Working closely with Network Rail, we are going to create a new main-line railway for the people of Oxfordshire and the Midlands. This deal demonstrates that real improvements to rail services can be paid for without public subsidy by attracting people out of their cars and on to trains."

The table below outlines the peak timetable improvements.

Phase 2

During October 2012, the Secretary of State for Transport granted permission for work to begin on Phase 2 of the Evergreen 3 project, with services between London Marylebone and Oxford. A new station, has been constructed at Water Eaton; the service between Oxford Parkway and London started on 26 October 2015, with the link from Oxford Parkway to  becoming operational on 12 December 2016. All signalling on the route (including the new platforms at Oxford) is controlled by the Marylebone Signalling Centre.

As part of Phase 2, the Oxford to Bicester Village service transferred from First Great Western to Chiltern in May 2011. Part of the line between Wolvercote Tunnel (on the outskirts of Oxford) and Bicester Village was restored to double track, and the scheme included additional platforms at Oxford,  and Bicester Village.

Network Rail provided the capital for the upgrade and will recover this through a facility charge over the subsequent 30 years, initially payable by Chiltern until its franchise expires, and then by the next franchisee. The infrastructure upgrade was carried out by main contractor BAM Nuttall, in partnership with Jarvis and WS Atkins.

Oxfordshire County Council supported the scheme, but required convincing of the benefits of the new Oxford Parkway station at Water Eaton, which is in the Green Belt. In November 2011, there was a further setback to the project when a planning inspector withheld approval due to the discovery of bats roosting in Wolvercote Tunnel. Great crested newts also had a breeding habitat close to the route. In early 2012, the "bat problem" was apparently resolved.

Rolling stock

Chiltern Railways inherited a fleet of 34 Class 165 Turbos diesel multiple units (DMUs) from British Rail. From the franchise's onset in July 1996, the company publicly promised to introduce new rolling stock. During December 2004, a further five Class 165s were transferred from First Great Western Link. Between 2003 and 2005, all 39 Class 165s were overhauled by Bombardier at Ilford EMU Depot; during this work, air conditioning units were installed throughout the fleet, while the hopper opening windows were removed; a first-class seating area was also implemented. As the fleet had been designed for suburban use, rather than InterCity travel, the Class 165s tend to be concentrated on services to Aylesbury and Banbury, although this stock can also be found operating the service between Birmingham and Leamington Spa.

Chiltern ordered several batches of Class 168 Clubman DMUs. Between 1998 and 2004, these entered revenue service, the company eventually operated nine three-car and ten four-car sets. These operate across the network.

In May 2011, a second Class 121 followed after being overhauled at Tyseley TMD. During March 2013, a third Class 121 (121032) was acquired from Arriva Trains Wales for use as a spare parts donor. On 19 May 2017, the Chiltern Bubble cars ran for the last time, as their age made spare parts increasingly difficult to obtain.

In January 2008, Chiltern ordered four two-coach Class 172 Turbostars; these entered service during June 2011. Because they cannot be fitted with the tripcock safety equipment necessary to operate on London Underground lines, none of the Class 172s can operate via  unless attached to a Class 165 or Class 168 DMU. Although initially intended for use on all-stations services out of London, they frequently operated as far afield as Birmingham. During mid-2021, all of Chiltern's Class 172s were leased to West Midlands Trains for use with their existing Class 172 fleet pending the delivery of British Rail Class 196 DMUs. In December 2021, it was later announced that the Class 172/1 fleet would not be returning to Chiltern once the Class 196s enter service with WMT.

Starting in December 2010, Chiltern began operating two peak-hour loco-hauled services consisting of a Class 67 diesel locomotive hauling a rake of Mark 3 coaches and a Driving Van Trailer.

After Wrexham & Shropshire ceased operations in January 2011, Chiltern started using a second ex-Wrexham & Shropshire set from May 2011. For the introduction of Chiltern's new timetable in September 2011, these sets had a Mainline logo and blue stripes added to their silver livery. Motive power continued to be provided by several Class 67s, including 67010, 67012-015 and 67018, all of which had been modified to operate with Driving Van Trailers.

During 2012, the ex-Wrexham & Shropshire Mark 3 coaches were overhauled and fitted with sliding plug doors (similar to those fitted to South West Trains' Class 444 Desiros) and toilet retention tanks by Wabtec's Doncaster Works. Once this work was completed, a further ten Mark 3s were overhauled by Wabtec to create a fifth set and to extend the existing sets up to six coaches. In 2012, the DB-Regio-owned Mark 3s used on the peak-hour Banbury service were given a light overhaul at LNWR, Bristol, and the Virgin-liveried examples repainted into British Rail blue/grey. To allow Class 168s to be cascaded to the new Oxford services as part of Evergreen 3, more Mark 3s are to be returned to service in the future.

Between 2015 and 2016, Class 170 Turbostars with First TransPennine Express transferred to Chiltern Railways. Chiltern took five of the First TransPennine Class 170s from May 2015 and the remaining four in July 2016. Upon delivery, the Class 170s were modified to allow them to be used with Chiltern's existing Class 168s, and reclassified as Class 168/3s.

In early 2014, Chiltern Railways agreed a sub-lease from Direct Rail Services (DRS) for six Class 68 locomotives for use on its London Marylebone to Birmingham service to replace the existing fleet of Class 67s. Maintenance and commissioning for the new fleet is assisted by DRS.

During 2017, Chiltern Railways entered into an agreement with Artemis Intelligent Power and the Rail Safety and Standards Board to provide one of its redundant DVTs as a donor vehicle for conversion into a new type of diesel locomotive.

In July 2021, Chiltern Railways converted a single Class 168 unit (168329) into a Battery Hybrid train, referred to as "HybridFlex"; during February 2022, it was first run on services between London and Aylesbury. The company promoted the HybridFlex as increasing acceleration while reducing fuel consumption, vibration, and noise emissions, along with lessening the environmental impact of rail travel.

Current fleet

Past fleet
Former train types operated by Chiltern Railways include:

Plans

In addition to the completed Evergreen initiatives, other potential enhancements for Chiltern's route have been discussed, but had not progressed as at the end of 2017. These include:
 Restoration of fast through lines at Beaconsfield as part of a longer-term aspiration for a 90-minute journey time between London and Birmingham.
 Remodelling Banbury Station and tracks.
 Building of the West Hampstead interchange to allow easy interchange with the London Overground - North London Line, Jubilee line, Metropolitan line and Thameslink services.
 New Chiltern Metro Service that would operate more than four trains per hour for Wembley Stadium, Sudbury & Harrow Road, Sudbury Hill Harrow, Northolt Park, South Ruislip and West Ruislip. This would require a reversing facility at West Ruislip, passing loops at Sudbury Hill Harrow, and a passing loop at Wembley Stadium (part of the old down fast line is in use as a central reversing siding, for stock movements and additionally for eight-car football shuttles to convey passengers to the stadium for events). This 'Chiltern Metro' service was not programmed into the last round of franchising agreements.
Two miles of the line north of Aylesbury re-opened on 14 December 2008, terminating at a new station, . However, during late 2017, the Government announced that the private company, East West Rail Company, had been formed to build and operate the line exclusively.
 Opening a rail line from Aylesbury to an M6-M1 Parkway Station near Rugby.

Since successful completion of Project Evergreen 3 has fulfilled Chiltern Railways' obligation to invest in infrastructure, there is no clear road to completion for these projects.

See also

 Chiltern Main Line
 London–Aylesbury line
 Varsity Line
 Deutsche Bahn, Chiltern Railways' owner
 London Midland

References

Citations

Bibliography

Further reading

External links

 
 Evergreen 3 Project

Arriva Group companies
John Laing Group
Railway companies established in 1996
Railway operators in London
Rail transport in Buckinghamshire
Train operating companies in the United Kingdom
1996 establishments in England